The Providence Gas Company Purifier House (Imperial Warehouse Company; City Tire Company) is a historic building at 200 Allens Avenue (corner of Public Street) in Providence, Rhode Island.  It is a large four-story steel-and-concrete structure, built in 1900 by the Berlin Iron Bridge Company, early in the era of steel frame construction.  It was used for the gasification of coal until about 1940, when it was purchased by the City Tire Company, which occupied it until 2000.  The building has been rehabilitated and converted for a variety of other uses.

The building was listed on the National Register of Historic Places in 2007.

See also
National Register of Historic Places listings in Providence, Rhode Island

References

Industrial buildings and structures on the National Register of Historic Places in Rhode Island
Infrastructure completed in 1900
Buildings and structures in Providence, Rhode Island
National Register of Historic Places in Providence, Rhode Island